Baklanikha is a rural locality (a village) in Yenangskoye Rural Settlement, Kichmengsko-Gorodetsky District, Vologda Oblast, Russia. The population was 2 as of 2002.

Geography 
The distance to Kichmengsky Gorodok is 70 km, to Nizhny Yenansk is 18 km. Vypolzovo is the nearest rural locality.

References 

Rural localities in Kichmengsko-Gorodetsky District